Charles Leo O'Neil (March 25, 1898 – June 20, 1928) was an American football player.  A native of Michigan, he played professional football as an end and back for the Evansville Crimson Giants and Toledo Maroons in the National Football League (NFL). He appeared in nine NFL games, six as a starter, from 1921 to 1923.

References

1898 births
1928 deaths
Players of American football from Michigan
Evansville Crimson Giants players
Toledo Maroons players